Lactista is a genus of band-winged grasshoppers in the family Acrididae. There are about 10 described species in Lactista.

Species
These 10 species belong to the genus Lactista:
 Lactista azteca (Saussure, 1861) (Aztec grasshopper)
 Lactista elota Otte, D., 1984
 Lactista eustatia Bland, 2002
 Lactista gibbosus Saussure, 1884 (trailside grasshopper)
 Lactista humilis Hebard, 1932
 Lactista inermus Rehn, 1900
 Lactista micrus (Hebard, 1932)
 Lactista pellepidus Saussure, 1884
 Lactista punctata (Stål, 1873)
 Lactista stramineus (Erichson, 1848)

References

Further reading

 
 

Oedipodinae
Articles created by Qbugbot